Rebecca Win (born May Hnin Nu on 15 February 1986) is a retired Burmese singer and model. She performed in the opening and closing ceremonies of the 2013 Southeast Asian Games in Naypyidaw. Rebecca Win was a judge on the major televised singing competition Eain Mat Sone Yar (Where dreams meet) and also Myanmar's Got Talent.

In 2013, she was appointed as a women's ambassador, along with Chit Thu Wai for Myanmar to raise awareness for gender equality and women's rights.

Early life and education
Rebecca Win was born on 15 February 1986 in Myitkyina, Kachin State to a Burmese father and a Kachin mother. One of four siblings. Her aunt L Khun Yi, her cousins L Lun Wa and L Seng Zi, are also popular singers. Her family moved to Yangon when she was just six months old. She converted to Christianity while she joined the church choir at age six. As of 2006, she was a final year Japanese major at the University of Foreign Languages, Yangon.

Career
Rebecca Win was first noticed when she entered Yangon-based City FM Radio's Music Idol contest in 2004. In 2016, she prepared to release three solo albums.

She released an album "Meka" on 9 February 2018, which was with Kachin language. 

She was announced to Media on 3 April 2020, she is taking rest from the professional life of music and model and requested to all not to call her as Rebecca Win of professional name.

Discography
 Takha Talay (Sometimes)
 Shote Kone Daw Me (Getting Complicated), collaborated with Yi Mon
Maka (2018)

TV show
Myanmar's Got Talent

Personal life
Rebecca Win married to Kaung Kyaw Swe, a businessman. They celebrate their wedding reception in Judson Church in Yangon for traditional wedding on May 4 2013, and also Sedona Hotel Yangon, on 10 May 2013, and concluded a no-fault divorce in 2020.

References

1986 births
Living people
Burmese Christians
Burmese female models
21st-century Burmese women singers
People from Yangon
Burmese people of Kachin descent
Converts to Christianity